Branyan is a rural locality in the Bundaberg Region, Queensland, Australia. In the  Branyan had a population of 4,134 people.

History 
Branyan Road Provisional School opened on 14 April 1905. On 1 January 1909 it became Branyan Road State School, Branyan Road State School became Independent Public School in 2016.

In the  Branyan had a population of 4,134 people.

Education 
Branyan Road State School is a government primary (Prep-6) school for boys and girls at Branyan Drive. In 2018, the school had an enrolment of 444 students with 33 teachers (27 full-time equivalent) and 16 non-teaching staff (11 full-time equivalent).

Heritage listings 
There are a number of heritage-listed sites in Branyan, including:
 Branyan Drive: Branyan Road State School

References

External links 
 

Bundaberg Region
Localities in Queensland